Proteuxoa atra is a moth of the family Noctuidae. It is found in the Australian Capital Territory, New South Wales, Tasmania and Victoria.

Adults have dark brown patterned forewings.

External links
Australian Faunal Directory
Australian Insects

Proteuxoa
Moths of Australia
Moths described in 1852